The Ferrari Dino engine is a line of mechanically similar V6 and V8 engines produced by Ferrari for about 40 years from the late 1950s into the early 2000s.

The idea for the engine came from Alfredo "Dino" Ferrari, who was the son of Enzo Ferrari. Dino suggested to Enzo Ferrari the development of a V6 engine for F2 at the end of 1955. Soon afterwards, Alfredo fell gravely ill, and he was diagnosed with  muscular dystrophy. While hospitalized, he discussed technical details about the engine with a recently hired engineer named Vittorio Jano. Dino would never live to see the engine; he died on June 30, 1956, at the age of 24.

The Dino V6 was Ferrari's first V6 engine. The Dino V8 engine was introduced later; the latter used a flat-plane crankshaft configuration.

V6

The production Dino V6 began as a discussion between Vittorio Jano and Enzo and Dino Ferrari about the ideal 1.5 L engine for use in the 1957 Formula Two auto racing series. Jano, formerly of Alfa Romeo and Lancia, pressed for a conventional 60° V6 but the Ferraris were open-minded.

60°
Jano's 60° design incorporated some of his ideas from the Lancia Aurelia, and were used in a number of Formula One, Formula Two, and Grand Prix cars from 1959 through the early 1960s.

65°
 
Ferrari designers began work on the first Dino V6 engine in 1956 and the engine was running by the end of the year. The engine displaced . This engine was installed in the Dino 156 F2 car and was first raced in the Grand Prix of Naples in April 1957, where it finished in third place behind two Lancia-Ferrari V8 Formula One cars.

The result of the trio's creativity was the world's only 65° V6 engine. The extra 5° between cylinder banks gave Ferrari the straight intakes he wanted. As this engine was not a true V6 but had a separate crankpin for every connecting rod, the crankpins were offset by 55 degrees within every pair of cylinders. This ensured an even firing order for the complete engine as well as an even distance between firing pulses per cylinder bank. Thus the engine was as smoothly running as a conventional 60-degree V6, but had greatly enhanced potential for the design of harmonically balanced exhaust manifolds, giving much better performance. Although the Dino V6 was discontinued with the introduction of the V8, the 65° design continues to this day: It reappeared on Ferrari's 1992 456 V12.

The   engine used in the 246 S produced  with dual overhead camshafts pushing two valves per cylinder. The rear mid-engine, rear-wheel-drive layout 1961 Ferrari 246 SP used this same engine, as did the 246 P F1.

The 65° Dino V6 continued in racing after 1962, and made its way to the street as well. The 60° unit was no longer being developed after the SP-series. Ferrari needed to have the engine in 500 production vehicles to homologate it for racing use. The company worked with Fiat to develop a sports car to house it, and the front-engine, rear-wheel-drive layout Fiat Dino project was born.

In competition, the 1965 Dino 166 P used a tiny  version of the 65° unit.

In 1968, Ferrari debuted its own Dino 206 GT, the company's first mid-engined road car. It used the 2.0 L engine from the 206 S transversely-mounted between the rear wheels.

The same V6 engine was handed off to Lancia for use in its WRC-champ Stratos in the early 1970s, but Ferrari's Dino had moved on to 8 cylinders.

Applications:
 2.0 L
 1966–1969 Fiat Dino
 1967–1969 Dino 206 GT
 2.4 L
 1969–1973 Fiat Dino
 1969–1974 Dino 246 GT and GTS
 1973–1975 Lancia Stratos

V8

2.9

Although the model name suggests 3.0 L, the V8 displaced only  which rounds down to 2.9 L and was another DOHC 2-valve design.

Applications:
 1973–1976 308 GT4 (branded "Dino") F106AL
 1976–1980 308 GT4 (branded "Ferrari") F106AL
 1975–1980 308 GTB F106AB
 1977–1980 308 GTS F106AB

Fuel injection

The 1980 "i" models added fuel injection to the existing  engine.

Applications:
 1980–1982 Mondial 8 F106B
 1980–1982 308 GTBi & GTSi F106BB

Quattrovalvole

A very unusual Dino Quattrovalvole was used in the Lancia Thema 8.32. It was based on the 308 QV's engine, but used a cross-plane crankshaft rather than the Ferrari-type flat-plane. The engine was constructed by Ducati rather than Ferrari, and was produced from 1986 through 1991.

The Quattrovalvole was also used by Lancia for their attempt at the World Sportscar Championship with the LC2. The engine was twin-turbocharged and destroked to 2.65 litres, but produced  in qualifying trim.

Applications:
 1982–1985 308 GTB QV & GTS QV F105AB
 1982–1985 Mondial QV F105A
 1986–1991 Lancia Thema 8.32 F105L
 1983–1991 Lancia LC2

2.0
These small V8 variants were chiefly intended for the domestic market, where cars with engines larger than two-litre incurred in an almost doubled 38% value added tax.

In 1975 the company introduced the Dino 208 GT4.
Applications:
 1975–1976 208 GT4 (branded "Dino") F106C
 1976–1980 208 GT4 (branded "Ferrari") F106C
 1980–1982 208 GTB F106CB
 1980–1982 208 GTS F106CB

Turbocharged
1982 saw the introduction of the 208 Turbo. The 208 Turbo featured , more than the fuel injected 308 from the previous year. Except for the non-intercooled 208 Turbo engine, all the forced induction F1 and road engines from 1980 to 1989 were designed and developed by Nicola Materazzi due to his experience in fuels, engines, combustion, turbo and Comprex that had accumulated in his career (Mobil, Lancia, Osella).

Applications:
 1982–1985 208 GTB Turbo F106D
 1982–1985 208 GTS Turbo F106D
 1986–1989 GTB Turbo F106N
 1986–1989 GTS Turbo F106N

288 GTO

The turbo also served as a development platform for the forthcoming 1984 288 GTO sports car. With IHI twin-turbochargers, a Behr intercooler, and Weber-Marelli fuel injection, the GTO boasted  from Dino's engine.

Applications:
 1984–1985 Ferrari 288 GTO (Designer: Nicola Materazzi)

3.2

The 1985 328 and 3.2 Mondial used a bored and stroked  3.0 QV V8 to  version called the Tipo F105CB. That naturally aspirated  engine boasted .

Applications:
 1985–1989 328 GTB & GTS
 1985–1989 3.2 Mondial

F117

 
The engine has a compression ratio of 9.8: 1 and a bore and stroke of 93 mm and 73.6 mm respectively, bringing total displacement to 3 999.66 cm³ (4.0 L). The engine also features double overhead camshafts with four valves per cylinder, as well as Weber-Marelli fuel injection and dry sump lubrication.

F120A

In 1987, the F40 sports car debuted with the Tipo F120A engine.

Applications:
 1987–1992 F40 (Designer: Nicola Materazzi)

F120B

Applications:
1989-1996 Ferrari F40 LM (Designer: Nicola Materazzi)

3.4

Applications:
 Tipo F129D & Tipo F119G
 1989–1993 348 tb & ts
 1989–1993 Mondial t
 1993–1994 348 GTB, GTS & Spider
 Tipo F119H
 1994 348 GTC

3.5

This Tipo F129B was used from 1994 through 1998. It was revised as the Tipo F129C, debuting in 1998 and used through 1999.

Applications:
 Tipo F129B
 1994–1998 F355 GTB & GTS
 1995–1998 F355 Spider
 Tipo F129C
 1998–1999 F355 GTB, GTS & Spider
 1998–1999 355 F1 GTB, GTS & Spider

3.6

Modifications to the intake/exhaust and an increased 11.2:1 compression ratio produced  for the 360 Challenge Stradale. This Tipo F131 was produced from 1999 through 2004.

Applications:
 1999–2004 360 Modena
 2000–2005 360 Spider
 2003 Challenge Stradale

The Dino V8 was retired in 2004 with the introduction of the new Ferrari-Maserati F136 engine used in the Ferrari F430.

V12
A new V12 engine family debuted in the 1992 456 as the Tipo F116. It featured the Dino 65° V angle with an 88 mm bore and the same 75 mm stroke as the Dino V8 found in the 348, that was produced at the time of introduction.

It was then revised again as the "Tipo F133" and used in the front engined 550 (5.5 litre) and later in 575M Maranello and 612 Scaglietti (5.75 litre).

See also
List of Ferrari engines

References

Bibliography
 Fitzgerald, Merritt and Thompson, Ferrari The Sports and Gran Turismo Cars, Fourth Edition, 1979, 

Dino
Formula One engines
Gasoline engines by model
V6 engines
V8 engines